Józef Kohut (born 16 December 1922 in Kraków - 3 January 1970 in Kraków) was a Polish footballer (striker) playing most of his career in Wisła Kraków. He was a top goalscorer of Ekstraklasa in 1948 season scoring 31 goals. Kohut played 11 times for Poland national football team scoring 4 goals.

References

1922 births
1970 deaths
Polish footballers
Poland international footballers
Wisła Kraków players
Legia Warsaw players
Ekstraklasa players
Footballers from Kraków
Association football forwards